Thomas Arthur Barry (April 10, 1879 – June 4, 1946) was a Major League Baseball pitcher who played for one season. He pitched in one game for the Philadelphia Phillies on April 15 during the 1904 Philadelphia Phillies season.

External links

1879 births
1946 deaths
Philadelphia Phillies players
Major League Baseball pitchers
Baseball players from Missouri
Chattanooga Lookouts players
Des Moines Midgets players
Des Moines Undertakers players
Peoria Distillers players
Kansas City Blues (baseball) players
Buffalo Bisons (minor league) players
Montreal Royals players